Kabin City Football Club is a Thai football club based in Amphoe Kabin Buri, Prachinburi Province. The club currently play in Regional League Division 2 Central & Eastern. This football is old Officer themself (Pol.Sen.Sgt.Maj. Pongphan Wongsuban).

Stadium and locations

Season by season record

See also
Surat Thani City F.C.
Kabin United F.C.

External links
http://www.tplshopping.com/club/%E0%B8%81%E0%B8%9A%E0%B8%B4%E0%B8%99%E0%B8%97%E0%B8%A3%E0%B9%8C%E0%B8%9A%E0%B8%B8%E0%B8%A3%E0%B8%B5-%E0%B9%80%E0%B8%AD%E0%B8%9F%E0%B8%8B%E0%B8%B5/article/2558
http://www.smmsport.com/m/news.php?n=75225
http://www.smmsport.com/reader.php?news=79190
https://web.archive.org/web/20170118035317/http://www.thailive.net/2017/01/02/%E0%B8%94%E0%B8%B9%E0%B8%81%E0%B8%B1%E0%B8%99%E0%B9%83%E0%B8%AB%E0%B9%89%E0%B8%95%E0%B8%B2%E0%B9%81%E0%B8%89%E0%B8%B0%E0%B8%AA%E0%B8%B8%E0%B8%A3%E0%B8%B2%E0%B8%A9%E0%B8%8E%E0%B8%A3%E0%B9%8C%E0%B8%98/

Association football clubs established in 2010
Football clubs in Thailand
Prachinburi province
2010 establishments in Thailand